Charles Mellor (December 27, 1893 – February 11, 1962) was an American long-distance runner. He competed at the 1920 and 1924 Summer Olympics. In 1925 he won the Boston Marathon.

References

External links
 

1893 births
1962 deaths
Athletes (track and field) at the 1920 Summer Olympics
Athletes (track and field) at the 1924 Summer Olympics
American male long-distance runners
American male marathon runners
Olympic track and field athletes of the United States
Track and field athletes from Chicago
Boston Marathon male winners
20th-century American people